"Motel Flamingo" is a song recorded by Canadian country music singer and songwriter Madeline Merlo for her forthcoming second studio album. It was written by Nicolle Galyon, Neil Medley, and Emily Weisband. The song was released to digital retailers through Open Road Recordings on May 19, 2017 and to radio on May 24 as the album's lead single.

"Motel Flamingo" reached number eight on the Canada Country chart, becoming Merlo's highest-charting single to date.

Critical reception
Nanci Dagg of Canadian Beats wrote that "Motel Flamingo" is a "great song" that encapsulates Merlo's "unique bohemian vibe." Top Country also complimented the song for reflecting Merlo's personality and called it a "vibrant single perfect for your summer playlist."

Chart performance
"Motel Flamingo" debuted at number 49 on the Canada Country chart dated June 24, 2017 and peaked at number 8 on the chart dated September 23, 2017. With this position, the song surpassed "Whatcha Wanna Do About It" (which peaked at number ten) as Merlo's highest-charting single to date. For the week of September 16, "Motel Flamingo" was the highest-ranking single by a female artist on the chart.

Music video
The official music video for "Motel Flamingo" was directed by Jaren Hayman and premiered August 7, 2017. It was filmed at the June Motel in Prince Edward County, Ontario. Featuring multiple references to the song's lyrics, including a front desk person resembling CeeLo Green to flamingo-shaped inflatable pool toys, the video finds Merlo throwing an "epic summer party."

Charts

Release history

References

Songs about hotels and motels
2017 songs
2017 singles
Madeline Merlo songs
Open Road Recordings singles
Songs written by Nicolle Galyon
Songs written by Emily Weisband